Charlie Appleby (born 5 July 1975) is a British thoroughbred racehorse trainer who is employed by Godolphin and trains horses at their Moulton Paddocks stable in Newmarket, Suffolk. He is the World Trainer of 2021 in the TRC Global Rankings and the British flat racing Champion Trainer in the 2021 season.

Major wins
 Great Britain
 2000 Guineas Stakes - (1) - Coroebus (2022)
 British Champions Sprint Stakes - (1) - Creative Force (2021)
 Coronation Cup - (1) - Ghaiyyath (2020)
 Dewhurst Stakes - (2) - Pinatubo (2019), Native Trail (2021)
 Platinum Jubilee Stakes / Diamond Jubilee Stakes - (2) - Blue Point (2019), Naval Crown (2022)
 Eclipse Stakes - (2) - Hawkbill (2016), Ghaiyyath (2020)
 Epsom Derby - (2) - Masar (2018), Adayar (2021)
 International Stakes - (1) - Ghaiyyath (2020)
 King's Stand Stakes - (2) - Blue Point (2018, 2019)
 Middle Park Stakes - (1) - Charming Thought (2014)
 Nassau Stakes - (1) - Wild Illusion (2018)
 King George VI and Queen Elizabeth Stakes - (1) - Adayar (2021)
 St James's Palace Stakes - (1) - Coroebus (2022)
 St Leger Stakes - (1) - Hurricane Lane (2021)

 France
 Grand Prix de Paris - (1)  - Hurricane Lane (2021) 
 Poule d'Essai des Poulains - (1)  - Modern Games (2022)
 Prix de la Forêt - (1)  - Space Blues (2021)
 Prix de l'Opéra - (1) - Wild Illusion (2018)
 Prix Jean Prat - (1) - Pinatubo (2020)
 Prix Marcel Boussac - (2) - Wuheida (2016), Wild Illusion (2017)
 Prix Maurice de Gheest- (1) -  Space Blues (2020)
 Prix Saint-Alary - (1) - Sobetsu (2017)

 Germany
 Grosser Preis von Baden - (2) - Ghaiyyath (2019), Barney Roy (2020)
 Bayerisches Zuchtrennen - (1) - Barney Roy (2020)
 Grosser Preis von Berlin - (1) -  Rebel's Romance (2022) 
 Preis von Europa - (1) -  Rebel's Romance (2022) 

 Ireland
 Vincent O'Brien National Stakes - (3) - Quorto (2018), Pinatubo (2019), Native Trail (2021)
 Irish Derby - (1) - Hurricane Lane (2021)
 Irish 2,000 Guineas - (1) - Native Trail (2022)

 United States
 Breeders' Cup Filly & Mare Turf - (1) - Wuheida (2017)
 Breeders' Cup Juvenile Turf - (3) - Outstrip (2013), Line of Duty (2018), Modern Games (2021)
 Breeders' Cup Juvenile Turf Sprint - (1) - Mischief Magic (2022)
 Breeders' Cup Mile-(2)-Space Blues (2021), Modern Games (2022)
 Breeders' Cup Turf-(2)- Yibir (2021), Rebel's Romance (2022)
 Diana Stakes - (1) - Althiqa (2021)
 Just A Game Stakes - (1) - Althiqa (2021)
 Saratoga Derby Invitational Stakes - (1) - Nations Pride (2022) 

 Australia
 Melbourne Cup - (1) - Cross Counter (2018)
 Sir Rupert Clarke Stakes - (1) - Jungle Cat (2018)
 Sydney Cup - (1) - Polarisation (2017)

 Canada
 Canadian International Stakes -(1) - Walton Street (2021)
 Natalma Stakes - (2) - La Pelosa (2018), Wild Beauty (2021)
 Northern Dancer Turf Stakes - (1) - Old Persian (2019) Summer Stakes - (2)-  Albahr (2021), Mysterious Night (2022)  Woodbine Mile - (1) -  Modern Games (2022) ''

References

Living people
British racehorse trainers
Place of birth missing (living people)
1975 births